Smith Branch is a stream in Moniteau County in the U.S. state of Missouri. It is a tributary of Willow Fork.

Smith Branch has the name of A. Smith, a pioneer citizen.

See also
List of rivers of Missouri

References

Rivers of Moniteau County, Missouri
Rivers of Missouri